Anna Brisbin is an American YouTuber and voice actress known for her YouTube channel Brizzy Voices. She is known for her voice impressions of fictional characters, such as Harry Potter, Pokémon and the Disney Princesses, as well as Disney characters in general.

Early life
Brisbin grew up in South Carolina. She attended the Tisch School of the Arts at New York University, where she majored in drama and completed the Stonestreet Studios acting program.

Career
In 2015, she co-narrated the novel A Tale of Two Besties, written by HelloGiggles co-founder Sophia Rossi. She had a voice acting role in a 2016 web series adaptation of the popular video game Happy Wheels, in which she played Janet (the Effective Shopper). In 2017, her voiceover challenge series Voice It! debuted on Facebook Watch. With fellow YouTuber Tessa Netting, she is the co-host of the podcast Fantastic Geeks and Where to Find Them, which was launched in 2018.

Beginning in May 2020 Brizzy Voices started to use her instagram to promote crowdfunding bail for arrested individuals In Portland.

Brizzy Voices was shortlisted for the Artisan Award at the 2017 Summer in the City Awards, but lost to Jamie Jo. In June 2021, Brisbin was revealed to have voiced Gargantuan Squabby in the Vertical Entertainment fantasy film A Fairy Tale After All.

Personal life 
Brisbin identifies as bisexual.

Filmography
Film

Television

Video games

References

External links

Living people
Actresses from South Carolina
American video game actresses
American voice actresses
American YouTubers
LGBT YouTubers
Tisch School of the Arts alumni
Year of birth missing (living people)
YouTube channels launched in 2012
21st-century American actresses